is a passenger railway station located in the town of  Kuroshio, Hata District, Kōchi Prefecture, Japan. It is operated by the Tosa Kuroshio Railway and has the station number "TK32".

Lines
Only local trains stop at the station.

Layout
There is no station building. The station, which is unmanned, consists of a single side platform serving a single line and is located on an embankment high above the adjacent main road and buildings. A ramp from the main road leads to a shelter for waiting passengers which is located on a lower level. Steps from the shelter lead up to the platform which is thus not wheelchair accessible. There is no shelter on the platform itself. The station is a designated evacuation area in the event of tsunamis.

Adjacent stations

History
The station opened on 1 October 1970 under the control of Japanese National Railways (JNR). After the privatization of JNR, control of the station passed to the Tosa Kuroshio Railway on 1 April 1988.

Passenger statistics
In fiscal 2011, the station was used by an average of 1 passenger daily.

Surrounding area
 National Route 56 runs next to the station below the embankment.

See also
 List of Railway Stations in Japan

References

External links

Railway stations in Kōchi Prefecture
Railway stations in Japan opened in 1970
Kuroshio, Kōchi